Headpiece (also spelled head-piece), is a decoration printed in the blank space at the beginning of a chapter or other division of a book, usually an ornamental panel, printer's ornament or a small illustration done by a professional illustrator.

The use of decorative headpieces in manuscripts was inherited by the medieval West from late Antique and Byzantine book production, and enjoyed particular popularity during the Renaissance.

Headpieces, sometimes incorporating a rubric or heading, as well as Zoomorphic and anthropomorphic motifs were used widely in manuscripts and in editions of the Bible in the 15th century.

Similarly, a tailpiece is located at the end of a chapter or section.

Notes and references

See also 

Page header
 Illustrated manuscripts
 Initial
 Miniature

Graphic design
Illustration
Visual motifs
Book design